A platitude is a trite, meaningless, or prosaic statement, often used as a thought-terminating cliché, aimed at quelling social, emotional, or cognitive unease. The statement may be true, but its meaning has been lost due to its excessive use.

Platitudes have been criticized as giving a false impression of wisdom, making it easy to accept falsehoods:
A platitude is even worse than a cliché. It’s a sanctimonious cliché, a statement that is not only old and overused but often moralistic and imperious. ... [P]latitudes have an aphoristic quality, they seem like timeless moral lessons. They therefore shape our view of the world, and can lull us into accepting things that are actually false and foolish.

Platitudes often take the form of tautologies, e.g., "it is what it is", making them appear vacuously true. But the phrase is used to mean "there is no way of changing it", which is no longer a tautology: "Structuring the sentiment as a tautology allows it to appear inescapable." At the same time, some phrases that have become platitudes may provide useful moral guidance, such as "do unto others as you would have them do unto you". Others, though widely trivialized, may be thought-provoking, such as "Be the change you wish to see in the world".

Etymology
The word is a borrowing from the French compound platitude, from plat 'flat' + -(i)tude '-ness', thus 'flatness'. The figurative sense is first attested in French in 1694 in the meaning 'the quality of banality' and in 1740 in the meaning 'a commonplace remark'. It is first attested in English in 1762.

Examples 
It doesn't matter who scores, as long as the team wins.
Sacrifice today for a better tomorrow.
Nobody’s perfect.
Good things come to those who wait.
Life is a mystery.
That’s just my personal opinion.
I wish I knew then what I know now.
Sometimes bad things lead to good things.
What doesn’t kill you makes you stronger.
We all die someday.
Everybody changes.
It really do be like that sometimes.
Take the good with the bad.
Everything isn’t always what it seems.
Everything happens for a reason.
Whatever will be, will be.

In philosophy
In philosophy, platitudes are beliefs or assertions about a topic that are generally accepted as common sense. In some approaches to conceptual analysis, they are taken as a starting point. Conjoining the platitudes on a topic may give a Ramsey sentence. Analyzing platitudes is part of the Canberra Plan of philosophical methodology.

See also

References

Bibliography

 Jay J. Smith, A Plethora of Platitudes: A collection of cliches and an assortment of adages, Writers Club Press (self-published), 2000. 
 James A. Chapman, Handbook of Grammar and Composition. Pensacola, FL: Beka Book Publications, 1985.

Rhetoric

es:Pedro Grullo